Karim Boostani (born in Masjed Soleyman) is a retired Iranian goalkeeper and current coach. He was formerly goalkeeping coach of Esteghlal, Sepahan, Saba Qom and Tractor Sazi.

References 

1952 births
Living people
Iranian footballers
Association football goalkeepers
Iranian football managers
Association football goalkeeping coaches
1980 AFC Asian Cup players
People from Masjed Soleyman
Sportspeople from Khuzestan province